The Huntington–Ashland metropolitan area is a metropolitan area in the Appalachian Plateau region of the United States. Referred to locally as the “Tri-State area”, and colloquially as "Kyova" (Kentucky, Ohio, and West Virginia), the region spans seven counties in the three states of Kentucky, Ohio, and West Virginia. With a population of 361,580,  the Tri-State area is nestled along the banks of the Ohio River.  The region offers a diverse range of outdoor activities.

Counties

Communities

Largest cities (more than 5,000 inhabitants)

Places with 1,000 to 5,000 inhabitants

Places with fewer than 1,000 inhabitants
 Athalia, Ohio
 Bancroft, West Virginia
 Bellefonte, Kentucky
 Chesapeake, Ohio
 Fort Gay, West Virginia
 Hanging Rock, Ohio
 Lavalette, West Virginia (census-designated place)
 Poca, West Virginia
 Proctorville, Ohio
 West Hamlin, West Virginia

Unincorporated places

Townships (Lawrence County, Ohio)

Demographics
As of 2018, there were 352,823 people and 136,769 households residing within the MSA. The racial makeup of the MSA was 93.9% White, 2.6% African American, 0.1% Native American, 0.5% Asian, 0.1% Pacific Islander, 0.1% from other races, and 1.8% from two or more races. Hispanic or Latino of any race were 1% of the population.

The median income for a household in the MSA was $45,535. The per capita income for the MSA was $25,801. 18.2% of the population is beneath the poverty line, including 23% of children and 11% of seniors.

In 2008, an Associated Press article designated the Huntington-Ashland metropolitan area as the unhealthiest in America, based on its analysis of data collected in 2006 by the Centers for Disease Control and Prevention. Nearly half the adults in this metropolitan area were obese.

Major highways
  Interstate 64
  U.S. Route 23
  U.S. Route 52
  U.S. Route 60
  West Virginia Route 2
  West Virginia Route 10
  West Virginia Route 152
  West Virginia Route 527
  Kentucky Route 3
  John Y. Brown Jr. AA Highway (KY 10)
  Industrial Parkway (KY 67)
  Kentucky Route 180
  Ohio State Route 7
  Ohio State Route 93
  Ohio State Route 527

Area codes
The following prefixes are used for long-distance phone service dialing to the region within the MSA.
 304, 681 – West Virginia Counties
 606 – Kentucky Counties
 740, 220 – Ohio

Higher education
 Ashland Community and Technical College
 Collins Career Center
 Huntington Junior College
 Marshall University
 Morehead State University at Ashland
 Mountwest Community and Technical College
 Ohio University Southern Campus

See also
 Kentucky census statistical areas
 Ohio census statistical areas
 West Virginia census statistical areas

References